St Jude's is a mixed residential, commercial and light industrial area of central Bristol, England. St Jude's forms part of the Lawrence Hill ward of Bristol City Council.

Geography

St Jude's is located to the east of Bristol city centre between Easton, Lawrence Hill, St Philip's Marsh and St Paul's. The area includes a mix of private a public residential areas, commercial zones and light industrial buildings.
St Jude's is bounded by the M32 motorway and A4032 road to the north, Cabot Circus shopping centre to the west and A4320 to the east. Stapleton Road is a major thoroughfare through the centre of St Jude's. Part of the land area of St Jude's was annexed to the city centre area of Broadmead for the construction of Cabot Circus in 2006.

According to Bristol City Council, St Jude's had 2,755 electors in 2019.

History

St Jude's takes its name from the former Church of England parish church of St Jude the Apostle, which was designed by Samuel Burleigh Gabriel and completed in 1849.

An excavation, of a proposed residential development on a site of 1,260m² at the corner and on the north-west side of Little Anne Street and Wade Street, uncovered 18th century artisan's houses which were removed in the years on either side of the Second World War as part of a so-called 'slum clearance' project. Census records and other primary sources suggest that a property within the bounds of the study site, 26 Wade Street, served as a pipe factory, while several pipemaking families and individuals resided within the area.

Amenities

St Jude's is served by a number of parks the largest of which is Riverside Park, located along the River Frome and the start of the Frome Valley Walkway. Rawnsley Park is located at the eastern side of the area at the border with Lawrence Hill.

Easton Leisure Centre is located in St Jude's, and contains a swimming pool, gym and sports halls for the community.

Stapleton Road leads through the centre of St Jude's and contains a number of local shops, a post office, pubs, take-aways and cafes.

Religion
A number of active and former religious buildings are present in St Jude's for various religions and of various denominations of religion.

Active Religious Buildings
There are a number of active religious buildings in St Jude's including the following:

Churches
 St Nicholas of Tolentino Roman Catholic Church
 St Mary's Orthodox Eritrean Church
 Great George Street Mission
The Congregational Centre Chapel
St Gabriel's Mission
The Salvation Army's Logos House providing accommodation for homeless people.

Mosques
Albaseera Bristol Centre

Former Religious Buildings
Former religious buildings that still exist but have been repurposed include:
The Trinity Centre, now a community hall.
St Jude the Apostle church, now private residences.

Transport
St Jude's is served by a number of bus services operated by First West of England, linking it to the city centre and the wider Bristol area. Two local railway stations are adjacent to St Jude's; Lawrence Hill station and Stapleton Road station.

St Jude's is located next to the M32 motorway, linking it to the M4 and M5 motorways. It is also bordered by the A4320 linking it to Bath.

References

External links

 St Judes Area Profile Bristol City Council

Saint Judes, Bristol